Constituencies of Kenya are used to elect members of the National Assembly, the lower chamber of the Kenyan Parliament. In accordance with article 89 of the 2010 Constitution of Kenya, there are 290 constituencies, based on a formula where these constituencies were to be delineated based on population numbers. Each constituency returns one MP.

In the following lists, the population of each of the 47 counties is given as enumerated in the census of 24 August 2009. Under each county is, the number of seats it has and a list of constituencies are given.

I. Former Coast Province

1. Mombasa 
 Population (2009): 939,370.
 Current number of seats: 6.
 Constituencies: 1. Changamwe, 2. Jomvu, 3. Kisauni, 4. Nyali, 5. Likoni, 6. Mvita.

2. Kwale County 
 Population (2009): 649,930.
 Current number of seats: 4.
 Constituencies: 7. Msambweni, 8. Lunga Lunga, 9. Matuga, 10. Kinango.

3. Kilifi County 
 Population (2009): 1,109,735.
 Current number of seats: 7.
 Constituencies: 11. Kilifi North, 12. Kilifi South, 13. Kaloleni, 14. Rabai, 15. Ganze, 16. Malindi, 17. Magarini.

4. Tana River County 
 Population (2009): 240,075.
 Current number of seats: 3.
 Constituencies: 18. Garsen, 19. Galole, 20. Bura.

5. Lamu County 
 Population (2009): 101,539.
 Current number of seats: 2.
 Constituencies: 21. Lamu East, 22. Lamu West.

6. Taita–Taveta County 
 Population (2009): 284,657.
 Current number of seats: 4.
 Constituencies: 23. Taveta, 24. Wundanyi, 25. Mwatate, 26. Voi.

II. Former North Eastern Province

7. Garissa County 
 Population (2009): 623,060.
 Current number of seats: 6.
 Constituencies: 27. Garissa Township (formerly Dujis Constituency), 28. Balambala, 29. Lagdera, 30. Dadaab, 31. Fafi, 32. Ijara.

8. Wajir County 
 Population (2009): 661,941.
 Current number of seats: 6.
 Constituencies: 33. Wajir North, 34. Wajir East, 35. Tarbaj, 36. Wajir West, 37. Eldas, 38. Wajir South.

9. Mandera County 
 Population (2009): 1,025,756.
 Current number of seats: 6.
 Constituencies: 39. Mandera West, 40. Banissa, 41. Mandera North, 42. Mandera South, 43. Mandera East, 44. Lafey.

III. Former Eastern Province

10. Marsabit County 
 Population (2009): 291,166.
 Current number of seats: 4.
 Constituencies: 45. Moyale, 46. North Horr, 47. Saku, 48. Laisamis.

11. Isiolo County 
 Population (2009): 143,294.
 Current number of seats: 2.
 Constituencies: 49. Isiolo North, 50. Isiolo South.

12. Meru County 
 Population (2009): 1,356,301.
 Current number of seats: 9.
 Constituencies: 51. Igembe South, 52. Igembe Central, 53. Igembe North, 54. Tigania West, 55. Tigania East, 56. North Imenti, 57. Buuri, 58. Central Imenti, 59. South Imenti.

13. Tharaka-Nithi County 
 Population (2009): 365,330.
 Current number of seats: 3.
 Constituencies: 60. Maara, 61. Chuka/Igambang'ombe, 62. Tharaka.

14. Embu County 
 Population (2009): 516,212.
 Current number of seats: 4.
 Constituencies: 63. Manyatta, 64. Runyenjes, 65. Mbeere South, 66. Mbeere North.

15. Kitui County 
 Population (2009): 1,012,709.
 Current number of seats: 8.
 Constituencies: 67. Mwingi North, 68. Mwingi West, 69. Mwingi Central, 70. Kitui West, 71. Kitui Rural, 72. Kitui Central, 73. Kitui East, 74. Kitui South.

16. Machakos County 
 Population (2009): 1,098,584.
 Current number of seats: 8.
 Constituencies: 75. Masinga, 76. Yatta, 77. Kangundo, 78. Matungulu, 79. Kathiani, 80. Mavoko, 81. Machakos Town, 82. Mwala.

17. Makueni County 
 Population (2009): 111,179.
 Current number of seats: 6.
 Constituencies: 83. Mbooni, 84. Kilome, 85. Kaiti, 86. Makueni, 87. Kibwezi West, 88. Kibwezi East.

IV. Former Central Province

18. Nyandarua County 
 Population (2009): 596,268.
 Current number of seats: 5.
 Constituencies: 89. Kinangop, 90. Kipipiri, 91. Ol Kalou, 92. Ol Jorok, 93. Ndaragwa.

19. Nyeri County 
 Population (2009): 693,558.
 Current number of seats: 6.
 Constituencies: 94. Tetu, 95. Kieni, 96. Mathira, 97. Othaya, 98. Mukurweini, 99. Nyeri Town.

20. Kirinyaga County 
 Population (2009): 528,054.
 Current number of seats: 4.
 Constituencies: 100. Mwea, 101. Gichugu, 102. Ndia, 103. Kirinyaga Central.

21. Murang'a County 
 Population (2009): 942,581.
 Current number of seats: 7.
 Constituencies: 104. Kangema, 105. Mathioya, 106. Kiharu, 107. Kigumo, 108. Maragwa, 109. Kandara, 110. Gatanga.

22. Kiambu County 
 Population (2009): 1,623,282.
 Current number of seats: 12.
 Constituencies: 111. Gatundu South, 112. Gatundu North, 113. Juja, 114. Thika Town, 115. Ruiru, 116. Githunguri, 117. Kiambu, 118. Kiambaa, 119. Kabete, 120. Kikuyu, 121. Limuru, 122. Lari.

V. Former Rift Valley Province

23. Turkana County 
 Population (2009): 855,399.
 Current number of seats: 6.
 Constituencies: 123. Turkana North, 124. Turkana West, 125. Turkana Central, 126. Loima, 127. Turkana South, 128. Turkana East.

24. West Pokot County 
 Population (2009): 512,690.
 Current number of seats: 4.
 Constituencies: 129. Kapenguria, 130. Sigor, 131. Kacheliba, 132. Pokot South.

25. Samburu County 
 Population (2009): 223,947.
 Current number of seats: 3.
 Constituencies: 133. Samburu West, 134. Samburu North, 135. Samburu East.

26. Trans-Nzoia County 
 Population (2009): 818,757.
 Current number of seats: 5.
 Constituencies: 136. Kwanza, 137. Endebess, 138. Saboti, 139. Kiminini, 140. Cherangany.

27. Uasin Gishu County 
 Population (2009): 894,179.
 Current number of seats: 6.
 Constituencies: 141. Soy, 142. Turbo, 143. Moiben, 144. Ainabkoi, 145. Kapseret, 146. Kesses.

28. Elgeyo-Marakwet County 
 Population (2009): 369,998.
 Current number of seats: 4.
 Constituencies: 147. Marakwet East, 148. Marakwet West, 149. Keiyo North, 150. Keiyo South.

29. Nandi County 
 Population (2009): 752,966.
 Current number of seats: 6.
 Constituencies: 151. Tinderet, 152. Aldai, 153. Nandi Hills, 154. Chesumei, 155. Emgwen, 156. Mosop.

30. Baringo County 
 Population (2009): 555,561.
 Current number of seats: 6.
 Constituencies: 157. Tiaty, 158. Baringo North, 159. Baringo Central, 160. Baringo South, 161. Mogotio, 162. Eldama Ravine.

31. Laikipia County 
 Population (2009): 399,227.
 Current number of seats: 3.
 Constituencies: 163. Laikipia West, 164. Laikipia East, 165. Laikipia North.

32. Nakuru County 
 Population (2009): 1,603,325.
 Current number of seats: 11.
 Constituencies: 166. Molo, 167. Njoro, 168. Naivasha, 169. Gilgil, 170. Kuresoi South, 171. Kuresoi North, 172. Subukia, 173. Rongai, 174. Bahati, 175. Nakuru Town West, 176. Nakuru Town East.

33. Narok County 
 Population (2009): 850,920.
 Current number of seats: 6.
 Constituencies: 177. Kilgoris, 178. Emurua Dikirr, 179. Narok North, 180. Narok East, 181. Narok South, 182. Narok West.

34. Kajiado County 
 Population (2009): 687,312.
 Current number of seats: 5.
 Constituencies: 183. Kajiado North, 184. Kajiado Central, 185. Kajiado East, 186. Kajiado West, 187. Kajiado South.

35. Kericho County 
 Population (2009): 758,339.
 Current number of seats: 6.
 Constituencies: 188. Kipkelion East, 189. Kipkelion West, 190. Ainamoi, 191. Bureti, 192. Belgut, 193. Sigowet–Soin.

36. Bomet County 
 Population (2009): 545,378.
 Current number of seats: 5.
 Constituencies: 194. Sotik, 195. Chepalungu, 196. Bomet East, 197. Bomet Central, 198. Konoin.

VI. Former Western Province

37. Kakamega County 
 Population (2009): 1,660,768.
 Current number of seats: 12.
 Constituencies: 199. Lugari, 200. Likuyani, 201. Malava, 202. Lurambi, 203. Navakholo, 204. Mumias West, 205. Mumias East, 206. Matungu, 207. Butere, 208. Khwisero, 209. Shinyalu, 210. Ikolomani.

38. Vihiga County 
 Population (2009): 554,622.
 Current number of seats: 5.
 Constituencies: 211. Vihiga, 212. Sabatia, 213. Hamisi, 214. Luanda, 215. Emuhaya.

39. Bungoma County 
 Population (2009): 1,630,934.
 Current number of seats: 9.
 Constituencies: 216. Mount Elgon, 217. Sirisia, 218. Kabuchai, 219. Bumula, 220. Kanduyi, 221. Webuye East, 222. Webuye West, 223. Kimilili, 224. Tongaren.

40. Busia County 
 Population (2009): 488,075.
 Current number of seats: 7.
 Constituencies: 225. Teso North, 226. Teso South, 227. Nambale, 228. Matayos, 229. Butula, 230. Funyula, 231. Budalangi.

VII. Former Nyanza Province

41. Siaya County 
 Population (2009): 842,304.
 Current number of seats: 6.
 Constituencies: 232. Ugenya, 233. Ugunja, 234. Alego Usonga, 235. Gem, 236. Bondo, 237. Rarieda.

42. Kisumu County 
 Population (2009): 968,909.
 Current number of seats: 7.
 Constituencies: 238. Kisumu East, 239. Kisumu West, 240. Kisumu Central, 241. Seme, 242. Nyando, 243. Muhoroni, 244. Nyakach.

43. Homa Bay County 
 Population (2009): 963,794.
 Current number of seats: 8.
 Constituencies: 245. Kasipul, 246. Kabondo Kasipul, 247. Karachuonyo, 248. Rangwe, 249. Homa Bay Town, 250. Ndhiwa, 251. Mbita, 252. Suba.

44. Migori County 
 Population (2009): 1,028,579.
 Current number of seats: 8.
 Constituencies: 253. Rongo, 254. Awendo, 255. Suna East, 256. Suna West, 257. Uriri, 258. Nyatike, 259. Kuria West, 260. Kuria East.

45. Kisii County 
 Population (2009): 1,152,282.
 Current number of seats: 9.
 Constituencies: 261. Bonchari, 262. South Mugirango, 263. Bomachoge Borabu, 264. Bobasi, 265. Bomachoge Chache, 266. Nyaribari Masaba, 267. Nyaribari Chache, 268. Kitutu Chache North, 269. Kitutu Chache South.

46. Nyamira County 
 Population (2009): 598,252.
 Current number of seats: 4.
 Constituencies: 270. Kitutu Masaba, 271. West Mugirango, 272. North Mugirango, 273. Borabu.

VIII. Former Nairobi Province

47. Nairobi County 
 Population (2009): 3,138,369.
 Current number of seats: 17.

External links 
 Independent Electoral and Boundaries Commission

 
Constituencies
Kenya